Yadira Helena Guevara-Prip (born May 22, 1995) is an American stage and television actress, best known for her roles in Star Trek: Discovery, Supernatural, 13 Reasons Why, and See.

Career
Guevara-Prip began her work as an actress on the stage in New York City, landing roles in many works by Latin American playwrights and theatre companies. During the 2010s Guevara-Prip performed in productions by the Atlantic Theater Company, Cherry Lane Theatre, and INTAR Theater, among others. In 2016 Guevara-Prip played the character of Lala in the world premiere of Pia Scala-Zankel's play Street Children, for which she was praised by The New York Times.

Guevara-Prip made her television debut in 2016 as Zinky on the Amazon Prime Video series Mad Dogs. In 2017 she landed the role of Kaia Nieves on Supernatural. Guevara-Prip went on to reprise the role for Supernaturals 13th, 14th and 15th seasons. In 2018 Guevara-Prip made her first appearance in the Star Trek franchise portraying the Xahean queen Me Hani Ika Hali Ka Po in the premiere episode of Short Treks on CBS All Access. She returned as Po for Star Trek: Discoverys second season, for the season's final two episodes.

In 2018, Guevara-Prip worked with the Breaking Walls Foundation to bring dozens of teens from around the world to Santiago, Chile for a residency of theatrical and creative writing workshops.

In 2019, Guevara-Prip became a regular cast member in the first season of the dystopian science fiction series See. The show was one of four inaugural scripted serials to be featured with the launch of Apple TV+ in November 2019, and Guevara-Prip starred as Bow Lion, a shadow warrior for a clan of nomadic people living 500 years in the future. Apple renewed the show for a second season shortly after its debut. In December 2019 the website Cinemaholic reported that Guevara-Prip would return for season 2.

In 2020, Guevara-Prip appeared on an episode of HBO's High Maintenance.

Filmography

Film

Television

References

External links
 

1995 births
Actresses from New York City
American people of Venezuelan descent
Living people
21st-century American women